Ray Moore may refer to:
Ray Moore (broadcaster) (1942–1989), British broadcaster
Ray Moore (comics) (1905–1984), comic strip artist and co-creator of The Phantom
Ray Moore (drag racer), American drag racer
Raymond Moore (tennis) (born 1946), former South African tennis player
Ray Moore (baseball) (1926–1995), former pitcher in Major League Baseball
Ray Moore (recording engineer), Grammy-award winning classical music recording engineer

See also
Raymond Moore (disambiguation)
Roy Moore (disambiguation)